Köklüce is a village in the Tunceli District, Tunceli Province, Turkey. The village is populated by Kurds of the Kurêşan tribe and had a population of 41 in 2021.

The hamlets of Anayol, Arıcık, Hopik and Karadere are attached to the village.

References 

Villages in Tunceli District
Kurdish settlements in Tunceli Province